Riccardo Tonin (born 30 January  2001) is an Italian professional footballer who plays as a midfielder for  club Monterosi, on loan from Foggia.

Club career
He was raised in the AC Milan youth system and began receiving call-ups to the senior squad in March 2021, but remained on the bench on those occasions.

On 29 July 2021, he joined Cesena on a season-long loan.

On 19 July 2022, Tonin signed a two-year deal with Foggia. On 13 January 2023, Tonin was loaned by Monterosi.

References

External links

2001 births
Living people
People from Arzignano
Sportspeople from the Province of Vicenza
Footballers from Veneto
Italian footballers
Italy youth international footballers
Association football midfielders
Serie C players
A.C. Milan players
Cesena F.C. players
Calcio Foggia 1920 players
Monterosi Tuscia F.C. players